Schoemansdal may refer to:

 Schoemansdal, Limpopo, South Africa (formerly called Oude Dorp and Zoutpansbergdorp)
 Schoemansdal, Mpumalanga, South Africa